Worldly Goods is a 1930 American pre-Code melodrama film directed by Phil Rosen based on a story by Andrew Soutar, starring James Kirkwood Sr. and Merna Kennedy. Distributed by Continental Talking Pictures, the film was released on August 1, 1930.

Premise 
Blinded by an airplane crash in France, Jeff swears vengeance on John C. Tullock, a profiteering manufacturer, who produces faulty planes for government contracts.

Cast 
James Kirkwood Sr. as John C. Tullock
Merna Kennedy as Mary Thurston
Shannon Day as Cassie
Ferdinand Schumann-Heink as Jeff
Eddie Fetherston as Jimmy (credited as "Eddie Featherstone")
Thomas A. Curran as the secretary

References

External links 
 
 

Melodrama films
Films directed by Phil Rosen
American drama films
1930 drama films
1930 films
American black-and-white films
1930s American films